Robert von Stein Redick is an American author of epic fantasy and mainstream fiction. He was born on December 4, 1967 in Charlottesville, Virginia and grew up in Virginia and Iowa City, Iowa. He attended the University of Virginia, where he studied English and Russian and went to graduate school at the University of Florida, where he earned a Master’s in Tropical Conservation and Development.

Robert has lived and worked in Indonesia, Colombia, Argentina, the United Kingdom and France. In addition to his own writing, he works as a freelance editor and international development consultant. He lives with his partner Kiran Asher in Western Massachusetts.

Bibliography

Novels

The Fire Sacraments Trilogy 
 Master Assassins (March 6, 2018)
 Sidewinders (July 6, 2021)
 Date and title of Book III to be announced

The Chathrand Voyage Quartet

The Red Wolf Conspiracy (2008)
The Ruling Sea (2009)
The River of Shadows (2011)
The Night of the Swarm (2013)

Other novels
Conquistadors (unpublished)

Short stories
 “Forever People” in Fearsome Journeys: The New Solaris Book of Fantasy (2013, edited by Jonathan Strahan)
 “Nocturne” in Unfettered: New Tales By Masters of Fantasy (2013, edited by Shawn Speakman)

References

External links
 Official website
 

21st-century American novelists
American fantasy writers
American male novelists
1967 births
Living people
American male short story writers
21st-century American short story writers
21st-century American male writers